Sigrún Björg Ólafsdóttir (born 19 June 2001) is an Icelandic basketball player for the University of Tennessee at Chattanooga and the Icelandic national team. She started her career with Haukar in the Icelandic Úrvalsdeild kvenna where she won the national championship in 2018.

Playing career
After coming up through Haukar junior teams, Sigrún played her first games in the top-tier Úrvalsdeild kvenna during the 2016–2017 season. She helped Haukar to the national championship in 2018, scoring 11 points, including three 3-pointers, in the fifth and deciding game of the best-of-five finals series against Valur.

In May 2020, Sigrún agreed to join the University of Tennessee at Chattanooga for the 2020–2021 season. On 1 March 2021, it was announced that Sigrún would return to the Úrvalsdeild and play for Fjölnir when her season with Chattanooga would end.

National team career
Sigrún was first selected to the Icelandic national team training camp in November 2018. She debuted with the team in May 2019.

Personal life
Sigrún is the daughter of Ólafur Rafnsson, the former president of FIBA Europe. Her older sister, Auður Íris Ólafsdóttir, was a member of the Icelandic national team.

References

External links
Icelandic statistics at Icelandic Basketball Association
Chattanooga bio

2001 births
Living people
Chattanooga Mocs women's basketball players
Sigrun Bjorg Olafsdottir
Guards (basketball)
Sigrun Bjorg Olafsdottir
Sigrun Bjorg Olafsdottir
Sigrun
Sigrun Bjorg Olafsdottir